People v. Ireland, 70 Cal.2d 522 (1969), was a case decided by the Supreme Court of California that first introduced the merger doctrine in that state.

Decision
The defendant shot his wife with two .38 caliber bullets and killed her.  The defendant was convicted of second degree murder after jury instructions were given that included an instruction on the felony murder rule.  The California Supreme Court reversed the conviction based on the merger doctrine.  The court reasoned that the underlying assault merged with the resulting homicide in the sense that the homicide did not require a felonious purpose independent of that that required for the assault.

References

Murder in California
U.S. state criminal case law
1969 in United States case law
California state case law
1969 in California
Crimes in California